Further is the third mixtape released by American recording artist Outasight. It was first released by Lifted Research Group during autumn of 2009 and then re-released by Asylum Records on March 19, 2010. The re-released extended play version included songs from the original mixtape as well as an extra song titled "Favors", recorded in the run up to the EP release.

Track listing

References

2009 mixtape albums